Monte Bissau is a mountain in the central part of the island of São Nicolau in Cape Verde. It is situated 3 km southwest of Belém and 6 km east of the island capital Ribeira Brava. Its elevation is 615 m.

See also
List of mountains in Cape Verde

References

Further reading
Reitmeier, Pitt  and Fortes, Lucete. Goldstadt Hiking Map São Nicolau 1: 50,000. Goldstadt-Verlag 2001. 

Bissau
Bissau
Ribeira Brava, Cape Verde